Georgi Haralampiev (born 10 September 1942) is a retired Bulgarian football midfielder.

References

1942 births
Living people
Bulgarian footballers
Botev Plovdiv players
PFC Slavia Sofia players
Bulgaria international footballers
Association football midfielders